Alexander García is a Mexican singer-songwriter of regional Mexican music known professionally as El Fantasma.

Life 
Alexander García was born in Las Canas, Durango. He worked as a gardener for six years before becoming a singer.

He performs regional Mexican music and corrido songs about hardworking people. On social media, fans nickname him the "King from the Underground."

His nickname began because his friends and family call him El Fanta. He was finalist at the 2019 Billboard Latin Music Awards.

In 2019, El Fantasma's single "Encantadora" charted number 1 on Regional Mexican Airplay. On August 14, 2021, his single "Soy Buen Amigo" charted number 1 on Regional Mexican Airplay. It also charted 27 on Hot Latin Songs.

References

External links
 

Living people
Year of birth missing (living people)
Singers from Durango
Mexican male singer-songwriters
21st-century Mexican male singers
Ranchera singers
Duranguense musicians